Elvira de Subirats (died 1220), was a Andorran regent. She was the regent of the County of Urgell during the minority of her daughter Aurembiaix in 1209-1220. 

She married Arnaud I of Castelbon and became the mother of Aurembiaix.

References

1220 deaths
13th-century women rulers
Andorran nobility